Cheng Yi (born May 17, 1990), is a Chinese actor and singer. He made his television debut in Chinese television drama Beauty World (2011) and graduated from Central Academy of Drama in 2012. In 2016, he featured in the hit Chinese television drama, Noble Aspirations, which helped him garnered increased popularity in China. He is also well known for his role Yu Sifeng in Love and Redemption and Ying Yuan in Immortal Samsara.

Filmography

Film

Television series

Variety show

Discography

Awards and nominations

Advertising Endorsement

References

External links 
 
 

1990 births
Living people
People from Huaihua
21st-century Chinese male actors
Chinese male film actors
Chinese male television actors
Male actors from Hunan
Central Academy of Drama alumni